The 1st Utah Senate District is located in Salt Lake County, which includes Salt Lake City, and includes Utah House Districts 20, 22, 23, 26, 29, 31 and 33.

The current State Senator representing the 1st district is Luz Robles Escamilla. Former Senator Fred Fife was elected to the Utah Senate in 2004. Fife was defeated by Robles at the Salt Lake County Democratic Convention on April 26, 2008. Robles won against Salt Lake City Councilman Carlton Christensen, the Republican nominee, in the General Election on Tuesday, November 4, 2008.

History

Senate district one was created in 1896 when Utah was admitted as a state. Abraham Zundel of Willard was elected to serve as the first Senator for District 1 in a special election held on November 5, 1895, but wasn't subsequently re-elected in the 1896 election. The district has undergone several major changes as a result of re-districting, originally representing Box Elder and Tooele counties instead of present-day Salt Lake County. Because of this the second Senator to represent the 1st District was William G. Nebeker of Ophir in Tooele County while the first was from Willard in Box Elder County.

W. Hughes Brockbank, a Republican, was elected president of the National Legislative Conference in 1969 becoming the first Utahn to hold this office.

Terry Williams, a Democrat from Salt Lake City, served in the Utah State Senate from 1983 to 1986 thus becoming the first African American to serve in the State Senate. Williams was originally elected to the Utah State House of Representatives and served from 1981 to 1982 but was preceded by Reverend Robert Harris of Ogden in 1976 as the first African American to serve in the State Legislature.

Williams unsuccessfully sought the Democratic nomination for the U.S. Senate in 1986. Craig Oliver, a real estate salesman, defeated Terry Williams in a tight primary election. Williams garnered 14,385 votes, or 49.55% to Oliver's 14,646 votes, or 50.45% for a vote difference of 261. Oliver faced off against Republican incumbent Jake Garn.

Frances Farley, a Democrat, served as Senator for District 1 from 1976 to 1982 being the first woman to be elected to the Utah Senate in 20 years. Farley unsuccessfully ran for Congress in 1982 and 1984 before again mounting a successful run for State Senate in District 1 in 1986. Farley was an advocate for women's rights and according to the Deseret News, 

[Farley] staged a news conference blasting the University Club for not allowing her into its sports grill. The protest launched a movement that eventually led decades-old male-only private clubs to open memberships to women. 

Farley retired from the Utah Senate in 1990.

Karen Shepherd, a Democrat, served as state senator for District 1 from 1991 to 1992. She was subsequently elected to represent Utah's 2nd congressional district in the U.S. House when Wayne Owens chose to run unsuccessfully for the U.S. Senate. Robert Steiner, a Democrat, replaced her as state senator. Steiner, the great grandson of Utah's U.S. Senator Thomas Kearns was a former part owner of the Salt Lake Tribune and heir of the Steiner American Linen Corporation. Steiner retired from the Senate in 1999.

Steiner purchased Jon Huntsman, Jr's. home when he became Governor of Utah.

Shepherd represented the 2nd congressional district from 1993 to 1995. Shepherd was the first female Senator to represent Utah in Congress since Reva Beck Bosone (1949–1953) who was the first female Congresswomen to represent Utah in the U.S. House. There has been no female U.S. Senator from Utah.

Fred J. Fife of Salt Lake City was elected to represent District 1 in 2004.  Fife was defeated at the state Democratic Convention by Luz Robles.  Robles went on to win the general election, defeating Salt Lake City Councilman Carlton Christensen, winning 56% of the vote.

Historical Representation

Note: This information may not be complete. Please add additional information and sources.

Previous State Senators (District 1)

Note: Information about legislators obtained from Utah State Legislature website.

Election results

2004 election

2008 election

2012 election

Current candidates

This seat is not currently up for election in the 2010 election but will be up for election in the 2012 election.

See also
 Luz Robles
 Utah Democratic Party
 Utah Republican Party
 Utah Senate

References

External links
 Utah Senate District Profiles
 Official Biography of Fred J. Fife

1
Salt Lake County, Utah